João Paulo de Souza Dantas (born 7 April 1988), simply known as João Paulo is a Brazilian professional footballer who plays as a defender.

References

External links
 
 
 João Paulo at Footballzz

1988 births
Living people
Association football defenders
Brazilian footballers
Brazilian expatriate footballers
S.C. Freamunde players
Chengdu Tiancheng F.C. players
Clube Atlético Bragantino players
Clube Atlético Sorocaba players
G.D. Chaves players
Sociedade Esportiva do Gama players
FC Politehnica Iași (2010) players
Shamakhi FK players
Retrô Futebol Clube Brasil players
Liga Portugal 2 players
Campeonato Brasileiro Série B players
Azerbaijan Premier League players
Liga I players
Expatriate footballers in Azerbaijan
Expatriate footballers in Portugal
Expatriate footballers in Romania
Expatriate footballers in Mexico
Brazilian expatriate sportspeople in Azerbaijan
Brazilian expatriate sportspeople in Portugal
Brazilian expatriate sportspeople in Romania
Brazilian expatriate sportspeople in Mexico
Footballers from São Paulo